Pearson's horseshoe bat (Rhinolophus pearsonii) is a species of bat in the family Rhinolophidae. It is found in Bangladesh, Bhutan, China, India, Laos, Malaysia, Myanmar, Nepal, Thailand and Vietnam.

The species is named after John Thomas Pearson. Additionally it is a food source of the parasite Sinospelaeobdella, a jawed land leech.

References

Rhinolophidae
Mammals of India
Mammals of Nepal
Mammals described in 1851
Bats of Asia
Taxa named by Thomas Horsfield
Taxonomy articles created by Polbot
Bats of Southeast Asia